Terry Gilliam (born 22 November 1940) is an American-born British filmmaker, comedian, animator, actor and former member of the Monty Python comedy troupe.

Gilliam has directed 13 feature films, including Time Bandits (1981), Brazil (1985), The Adventures of Baron Munchausen (1988), The Fisher King (1991), 12 Monkeys (1995), Fear and Loathing in Las Vegas (1998), The Brothers Grimm (2005), Tideland (2005), and The Imaginarium of Doctor Parnassus (2009). Being the only Monty Python member not born in Britain, he became a naturalised British subject in 1968 and formally renounced his American citizenship in 2006.

Gilliam was born in Minnesota, but spent his high school and college years in Los Angeles. He started his career as an animator and strip cartoonist. He joined Monty Python as the animator of their works, but eventually became a full member and was given acting roles. He became a feature film director in the 1970s. Most of his films explore the theme of imagination and its importance to life, express his opposition to bureaucracy and authoritarianism, and feature characters facing dark or paranoid situations. His own scripts feature black comedy and tragicomedic elements, as well as surprise endings.

In 1988, Gilliam and the other Monty Python members received the BAFTA Award for Outstanding British Contribution to Cinema. In 2009, Gilliam received the BAFTA Fellowship for lifetime achievement.

Early life 
Terry Gilliam was born on 22 November 1940 in Minneapolis, Minnesota, the son of Beatrice (née Vance) and James Hall Gilliam. His father was a travelling salesman for Folgers before becoming a carpenter. Soon after, they moved to nearby Medicine Lake, Minnesota. In 1952, the family moved to the Los Angeles neighbourhood of Panorama City. Gilliam attended Birmingham High School, where he was the president of his class and senior prom king, and was voted "Most Likely to Succeed" having achieved straight A grades. During high school, he began to avidly read Mad magazine, then edited by Harvey Kurtzman, which would later influence Gilliam's work.

Gilliam graduated from Occidental College in 1962 with a Bachelor of Arts in political science. In 2003, he told Salman Rushdie about defining experiences in the 1960s that set the foundations for his views on the world:

Career

1965–1969: Animation and move to England 
Gilliam began his career as an animator and strip cartoonist. One of his early photographic strips for the US magazine Help! featured future Python cast member John Cleese. When Help! folded, Gilliam went to Europe, jokingly announcing in the final issue that he was "being transferred to the European branch" of the magazine, which did not exist. Moving to England, he animated sequences for the children's series Do Not Adjust Your Set which he worked on from 1968 to 1969, and which also featured Eric Idle, Terry Jones, and Michael Palin.

1969–1974: Monty Python's Flying Circus 

Gilliam was a member of Monty Python's Flying Circus from its outset, credited at first as an animator (his name was listed separately after the other five in the closing credits) and later as a full member. His cartoons linked the show's sketches together and defined the group's visual language in other media, such as LP and book covers and the title sequences of their films. His animations mix his own art, characterised by soft gradients and odd, bulbous shapes, with backgrounds and moving cutouts from antique photographs, mostly from the Victorian era.

He also appeared in several sketches, though he rarely had main roles and did considerably less acting in the sketches. Gilliam did, however, have some notable sketch roles, such as Cardinal Fang of the Spanish Inquisition; the bespectacled commenter who said, "I can't add anything to that!" in the sketch "Election Night Special"; Kevin Garibaldi, the brat on the couch shouting "I want more beans!" in the sketch "Most Awful Family in Britain 1974" (episode 45); the Screaming Queen in a cape and mask in "The Visitors"; and Percy Bysshe Shelley in "Ant Poetry Reading". More frequently, he played parts that no one else wanted to play, generally because they required a lot of makeup or uncomfortable costumes, such as a recurring knight in armour who ended sketches by walking on and hitting one of the other characters over the head with a plucked chicken. He also designed the covers of most of the Monty Python albums, including Another Monty Python Record, The Monty Python Matching Tie and Handkerchief, Monty Python Live at Drury Lane, and all of their later film soundtrack albums. Katy Hepburn, a freelance designer and graduate of the Royal College of Art in London, also worked with Gilliam.

1975–1983: Transitional years 

In 1975, Gilliam began his career as a director by co-directing Monty Python and the Holy Grail with Terry Jones. Gilliam was responsible for photography and also appeared as both Patsy and the Old Man from Scene 24, while Jones guided the actors' performances. It was the only Python film directed by Gilliam, though he continued to act in their subsequent projects.

As Python started to take longer breaks between projects following Monty Python and the Holy Grail, Gilliam became a solo filmmaker, building upon the experience he had acquired. In 1977, he directed his first film outside the group, Jabberwocky, also a comedy set in the Middle Ages. It featured Python member Michael Palin in the lead role, and was based on the poem of the same name. In 1978, he published Animations of Mortality, an illustrated, tongue-in-cheek, semi-autobiographical how-to guide to his animation techniques and the visual language in them.

Gilliam served as art director on Monty Python's Life of Brian, Terry Jones having taken on sole directing duties. Gilliam made Time Bandits in 1981. Following directing the short film The Crimson Permanent Assurance, which opened showings of Monty Python's The Meaning of Life, Python effectively ceased working together, and Gilliam pursued his career as a filmmaker.

1984–1998: Trilogies and critical success 
Gilliam says he used to think of his films in terms of trilogies, starting with Time Bandits. The "Trilogy of Imagination", written by Gilliam, about "the ages of man", consisted of Time Bandits (1981), Brazil (1985), and The Adventures of Baron Munchausen (1988). All are about the "craziness of our awkwardly ordered society and the desire to escape it through whatever means possible." All three films focus on these struggles and attempts to escape them through imagination: Time Bandits through the eyes of a child, Brazil through the eyes of a man in his thirties, and Munchausen through the eyes of an elderly man. In the summer of 1986, he cut ties with Arnon Milchan and 20th Century Fox and started directing the latter through his own new Prominent Films banner independently.

In the 1990s, Gilliam directed a trilogy of Americana: The Fisher King (1991), 12 Monkeys (1995), and Fear and Loathing in Las Vegas (1998), which took place on North American soil and, while still surreal, had fewer fantastical plots than his previous trilogy.

1999–2002: Career stalling and TV commercials 
In 1999, Gilliam attempted to film The Man Who Killed Don Quixote, which was budgeted at US$32.1 million, making it among the highest-budgeted films to use only European financing; but in the first week of shooting, the actor playing Don Quixote (Jean Rochefort) suffered a herniated disc, and a flood severely damaged the set. The film was cancelled, resulting in an insurance claim of US$15 million. Despite the cancellation, the aborted project did yield the 2002 documentary Lost in La Mancha, produced from film from a second crew that had been hired by Gilliam to document the making of Quixote. After the cancellation, both Gilliam and the film's co-lead, Johnny Depp, wanted to revive the project. The insurance company involved in the failed first attempt withheld the rights to the screenplay for several years with the production on hold until 2008.

Following the failure of The Man Who Killed Don Quixote, J. K. Rowling, the author of the Harry Potter series and a fan of Gilliam's work, advocated for him to direct Harry Potter and the Philosopher's Stone in 2000, but Warner Bros. ultimately chose Chris Columbus for the job. In response to this decision, Gilliam said that "I was the perfect guy to do Harry Potter. I remember leaving the meeting, getting in my car, and driving for about two hours along Mulholland Drive just so angry. I mean, Chris Columbus' versions are terrible. Just dull. Pedestrian."

In 2002, Gilliam directed a series of television advertisements called "Secret Tournament". Part of Nike's 2002 FIFA World Cup campaign, the advertisements feature a secret three-on-three tournament between the world's best football players, including Ronaldo, Ronaldinho and Thierry Henry, who are inside a huge tanker ship. The advertisements are accompanied with a remixed version of the Elvis Presley song "A Little Less Conversation".

2003–2009: Film, theatre, and the death of Heath Ledger 
In 2005, Gilliam released The Brothers Grimm, followed later in the year by Tideland.
In 2006, Gilliam made his debut as theatre director by directing the stage show Slava's Diabolo, created and staged by the Russian clown artist Slava Polunin. The show combined Polunin's clown style, characterised by deep nonverbal expression and interaction with the audience, with Gilliam's rich visuals and surrealistic imagery. The show premiered at the Noga Hall of the Gesher Theatre in Jaffa, Tel Aviv, Israel.

In January 2007, Gilliam announced that he had been working on a new project with his writing partner Charles McKeown. One day later, the fansite Dreams reported that the new project was titled The Imaginarium of Doctor Parnassus; the following October, Dreams confirmed that this would be Gilliam's next project and was slated to star Christopher Plummer and Tom Waits. Production began in December 2007 in London. On 22 January 2008, production of the film was disrupted following the death of Heath Ledger in New York City. Variety reported that Ledger's involvement had been a "key factor" in the film's financing. Production was suspended indefinitely by 24 January, but in February the actors Johnny Depp, Jude Law, and Colin Farrell signed on to continue Ledger's role, transforming into multiple incarnations of his character in the "magical" world of the film. Thanks to this arrangement the principal photography was completed on 15 April 2008, on schedule. During the filming, Gilliam was accidentally hit by a bus and suffered a broken back. The film had successful screenings including a premiere at the 62nd Cannes Film Festival. The UK release for the film was scheduled for 6 June 2009, but was pushed back to 16 October 2009. The USA release was on 25 December 2009. Eventually, this $30 million-budgeted film had grossed more than $60 million in worldwide theatrical release and received two Academy Award nominations. The film's end credit states that the film is dedicated to the memories of Ledger and William Vince. Depp, Farrell, and Law donated their proceeds from the film to Ledger's daughter.

2010–present: Theatre projects, and The Man Who Killed Don Quixote 
Gilliam made his opera debut at London's English National Opera (ENO) in May 2011, directing The Damnation of Faust, by Hector Berlioz. The production received positive reviews in the British press On 16 September 2012, the production opened at the Vlaamse Opera in Ghent, Belgium, in the opera's original French-language version and received praise from critics and audiences alike. After a number of performances in Ghent, the production moved to the opera house in Antwerp for a sold-out run of performances.

In July 2012, Gilliam revealed plans for a film which would be shot in Bucharest, Romania. He denied that it would be Don Quixote but refused to give any further details. The actor David Walliams reportedly entered into talks with Gilliam to play a part in it and was told that he'd have to "be willing to work with Johnny Depp and fly to Bucharest where the movie is to be filmed." Depp, to that point, had made no mention of his involvement but was seen in Bucharest around the same time in mid-July as Romanian news outlets reported Gilliam was staying in the city for negotiations on studio work with the Romanian film production company MediaPro Studios. On 13 August 2012, this project was announced to be The Zero Theorem, set to start shooting in Bucharest on 22 October, produced by Dean Zanuck (son of the late Richard D. Zanuck, who was originally to produce the film in 2009), with worldwide sales handled by Voltage Pictures, Toronto, and starring the Academy Award–winner Christoph Waltz in the lead (replacing Billy Bob Thornton, who had been attached to the project in 2009). The Zero Theorem premiered at the 70th Venice International Film Festival on 2 September 2013.

In June 2014, Gilliam followed up on his success with Faust with a new ENO production of another opera by Berlioz, the rarely performed Benvenuto Cellini.

After regaining the rights to the screenplay of The Man Who Killed Don Quixote, Gilliam restarted preproduction in 2008, with Johnny Depp still attached to the project. The film was to be reshot completely, with Rochefort's role recast. Michael Palin reportedly entered into talks with Gilliam about stepping in for Rochefort and playing Don Quixote. However, Gilliam revealed on the Canadian talk show The Hour on 17 December 2009, that Robert Duvall had been cast to play Quixote, before the film was postponed once again. In January 2014, Gilliam wrote on Facebook that "Dreams of Don Quixote have begun again". At the Cannes Film Festival in 2016, it was confirmed that The Man Who Killed Don Quixote was going to be made, with Michael Palin and Adam Driver in starring roles. In March 2017, filming finally began, with Driver and Jonathan Pryce starring. On 4 June 2017, Gilliam announced that the shooting of the film was complete. The film premiered on 19 May 2018, as the closing film of the 2018 Cannes Film Festival (where it received a standing ovation), and was released in French theatres the same day.

His production of Into The Woods, which he co-directed with Leah Hausman, premiered at the Theatre Royal, Bath in August 2022 to positive reviews.

Future projects 

As of 2014 Gilliam was in talks to make his first animated feature film with Laika, the studio behind Coraline and ParaNorman.

He has been involved off-and-on for years with an adaptation of The Defective Detective, which Gilliam wrote with Richard LaGravenese (who wrote The Fisher King). While promoting the US theatrical release of The Zero Theorem, Gilliam revealed he and LaGravenese were meeting to see if The Defective Detective script could be made into a miniseries. If this comes together, it would be the first time Gilliam has ever directed for television.
During the second half of 2011, Gilliam and Paul Auster wrote a screenplay for a film adaptation of Auster's novel Mr. Vertigo. In June 2018, Gilliam announced at the Brussels International Film Festival that he was working again on Mr. Vertigo, and that it might be his next film, and that he had Ralph Fiennes attached to star in it.

In addition to film projects as director, Gilliam has been involved with developing projects for other artists and mediums. On 16 December 2010, Variety reported that Gilliam was to "godfather" a film called 1884, described as an animated steampunk parody of George Orwell's Nineteen Eighty-Four, with several former Pythons lending their voices to the project; Gilliam was to be credited as "creative advisor". In October 2015, in a webchat hosted by The Guardian, Gilliam announced that he was working on "a TV series based on Time Bandits" and "another based on a script by Richard LaGravanese and I wrote after Fisher King, called The Defective Detective".

Abandoned clip art project 
Fifteen years after the publication of Gilliam's Animations of Mortality, between the release of the CD-ROM game Monty Python's Complete Waste of Time in 1994, which used many of Gilliam's animation templates, and the making of Gilliam's film Fear and Loathing in Las Vegas (1998), Gilliam was in negotiations with Enteractive, a software company, to tentatively release in the autumn of 1996 a CD-ROM under the same title as his 1978 book, containing all of his thousands of 1970s animation templates as licence-free clip arts for people to create their own flash animations, but the project hovered in limbo for years, probably because Enteractive was about to downsize greatly in mid-1996 and changed its focus from CD-ROM multimedia presentations to internet business solutions and web hosting in 1997 (in the introduction to their 2004 book Terry Gilliam: Interviews, David Sterrit and Lucille Rhodes claimed that the internet had overwhelmed the "computer-communications market" and gave this as the reason that the Animations of Mortality CD-ROM never materialised). Around the time of Gilliam's film The Imaginarium of Doctor Parnassus (2009), the project had changed into the idea of releasing his 1970s animation templates as a licence-free download of Adobe After Effects or similar files.

Analysis

Themes and philosophy 

As for his philosophical background in screenwriting and directing, Gilliam said on the TV show First Hand on RoundhouseTV, "There's so many film schools, so many media courses which I actually am opposed to. Because I think it's more important to be educated, to read, to learn things, because if you're gonna be in the media and if you'll have to say things, you have to know things. If you only know about cameras and 'the media', what're you gonna be talking about except cameras and the media? So it's better learning about philosophy and art and architecture [and] literature, these are the things to be concentrating on it seems to me. Then, you can fly...!"

Gilliam's films are usually imaginative fantasies. His long-time co-writer Charles McKeown commented, "the theme of imagination, and the importance of imagination, to how you live and how you think and so on ... that's very much a Terry theme." Most of Gilliam's films include plotlines that seem to occur partly or completely in the characters' imaginations, raising questions about the definition of identity and sanity. He often shows his opposition to bureaucracy and authoritarian regimes. He also distinguishes "higher" and "lower" layers of society, with a disturbing and ironic style. His films usually feature a fight or struggle against a great power which may be an emotional situation, a human-made idol, or even the person himself, and the situations do not always end happily. There is often a dark, paranoid atmosphere and unusual characters who used to be normal members of society. His scripts feature black comedy and often end with a dark tragicomic twist.

Gilliam is fascinated with the Baroque period because of the pronounced struggle between spirituality and rationality in that era. There is often a rich baroqueness and dichotomous eclecticism about his films, with, for instance, high-tech computer monitors equipped with low-tech magnifying lenses in Brazil and a red knight covered with flapping bits of cloth in The Fisher King. He also is given to incongruous juxtapositions of beauty and ugliness or antique and modern. Regarding Gilliam's theme of modernity's struggle between spirituality and rationality whereas the individual may become dominated by a tyrannical, soulless machinery of disenchanted society, the film critic Keith James Hamel observed a specific affinity of Gilliam's films with the writings of the historian Arnold Toynbee and the sociologist Max Weber, specifically the latter's concept of the "iron cage" of rationality.

Look and style 

Gilliam's films have a distinctive look, not only in mise-en-scène but even more so in photography, often recognisable from just a short clip; to create a surreal atmosphere of psychological unrest and a world out of balance, he frequently uses unusual camera angles, particularly low-angle shots, high-angle shots, and Dutch angles. Roger Ebert said that "his world is always hallucinatory in its richness of detail". Most of his movies are shot almost entirely with rectilinear ultra-wide-angle lenses with focal lengths of 28 mm or less to achieve a distinctive style defined by extreme perspective distortion and extremely deep focus. Gilliam's long-time director of photography Nicola Pecorini has said, "with Terry and me, a long lens means something between a 40 mm and a 65 mm." This attitude markedly differs from the common definition in photography, by which 40 to 65 mm is the focal length of a normal lens, resembling the natural human field of view, unlike Gilliam's signature style, defined by extreme perspective distortion due to his usual choice of focal length. The 14 mm lens has become informally known as "The Gilliam" among filmmakers because of his frequent use of it at least since Brazil. Gilliam has explained his preference for using wide-angle lenses in his films:

In another interview, Gilliam mentioned, in relation to the 9.8 mm Kinoptic lens he had first used on Brazil, that wide-angle lenses make small film sets "look big". The widest lens he has used so far is an 8 mm Zeiss lens employed in filming The Imaginarium of Doctor Parnassus.

Commercial success 
Gilliam's first successful feature, Time Bandits (1981), earned more than eight times its original budget in the United States alone. The Adventures of Baron Munchausen (1988), although commercially unsuccessful, was nominated for four Oscars and won three BAFTA Awards, among several other Prizes in Europe. The Fisher King (1991), his first film not to feature a member of the Monty Python troupe, had a budget of $24 million and grossed more than $41 million at United States box office. 12 Monkeys grossed more than US$168 million worldwide. The Brothers Grimm, despite a mixed critical reception, grossed over US$105 million worldwide. The Imaginarium of Doctor Parnassus, with a budget of $30 million, has been an international commercial success, grossing over $60 million in worldwide theatrical release.
According to Box Office Mojo, his films have grossed an average of $21,602,510.

Personal life 
Gilliam has been married to British makeup artist Maggie Weston since 1973. She worked on Monty Python's Flying Circus, many of the Python films, and Gilliam's films up to The Adventures of Baron Munchausen. They have three children: Amy Rainbow (born 1978), Holly Dubois (born October 1980) and Harry Thunder (born 3 April 1988), who have also appeared in or worked on several of his films.

In 1968, Gilliam obtained British citizenship. He held dual American and British citizenship for the next 38 years, until he renounced his American citizenship in January 2006. In an interview with Der Tagesspiegel, he described the action as a protest against then-President George W. Bush, and in an earlier interview with The A.V. Club, he also indicated that it was related to concerns about future tax liability for his wife and children. As a result of renouncing his citizenship, Gilliam was permitted to spend 30 days each year in the United States over the next ten years, "less than any European". Holly followed suit, renouncing her American citizenship in 2017.

He maintains a residence in Italy near the Umbria–Tuscany border. He has been instrumental in establishing the annual Umbria Film Festival, held in the nearby town of Montone. Gilliam also resides in Highgate, London.

On 8 September 2015, Variety mistakenly published a false obituary claiming that Gilliam had died.

In May 2018, Gilliam suffered a perforated medullary artery that was erroneously reported in the media as a stroke.

Charitable activities 
Gilliam has been involved with a number of charitable and humanitarian causes. In 2009, he became a board member of Videre Est Credere (Latin for "to see is to believe"), a UK human rights charity. Videre describes itself as giving "local activists the equipment, training and support needed to safely capture compelling video evidence of human rights violations. This captured footage is verified, analysed and then distributed to those who can create change." He participates alongside movie producer Uri Fruchtmann, music producer Brian Eno and executive director of Greenpeace UK John Sauven.

Filmography

Awards, nominations and honours (films)

Awards, nominations and honours (personal) 
Academy Awards

BAFTA Awards

Golden Globe Awards

Saturn Awards

Other awards
 Brazil (1985)
 3 Los Angeles Film Critics Association Award for Best Film, Director, and Screenplay
 The Adventures of Baron Munchausen (1988)
 3 Silver Ribbons awarded by the Italian National Syndicate of Film Journalists Best Cinematography, Best Costume Design, Best Production Design
 Hugo Award nomination for Best Dramatic Presentation
 The Fisher King (1991)
 Venice Film Festival Silver Lion Winner
 Los Angeles Film Critics Association Award for Best Actress (Mercedes Ruehl)
 4 Los Angeles Film Critics Association nominations Best Picture, Best Director, Best Supporting Actress (Amanda Plummer), Best Screenplay
 Toronto International Film Festival People's Choice Award Winner
 12 Monkeys (1995)
 Empire Award Best Director
 Fear and Loathing in Las Vegas (1998)
 Cannes Film Festival Official Selection
 The Brothers Grimm (2005)
 Venice Film Festival Official Selection
 Tideland (2005)
 San Sebastian Festival Winner of the FIPRESCI Prize
 The Imaginarium of Doctor Parnassus (2009)
 2 Empire Awards nominations Best British Film, Best Sci-Fi/Fantasy
 Best Fantasy Film nomination by the Costume Designers Guild of America
 British Independent Film Awards nomination for Best Achievement in Production
 International Press Academy Satellite Award Best Costume Design, 3 more nominations for Best Visual Effects, Best Art Direction & Production Design, Best Original Song
 Voted Best Fantasy Film of the Year by readers of the Total Sci-Fi Online magazine.
 The Man Who Killed Don Quixote (2018)
 Magritte Award for Best Foreign Film in Coproduction
 An asteroid, 9619 Terrygilliam, is named in his honour.
 Gilliam was given the BAFTA Academy Fellowship Award in 2009 for his contribution to motion picture arts.
 Gilliam was also given a BAFTA Special Award in 1969 for the graphics and animations in Monty Python's Flying Circus.
 Terry Gilliam was awarded the Fellowship of the Kermodes, by film critic Mark Kermode.
 Gilliam was honoured with the Director with Unique Visual Sensitivity Award at the Camerimage film festival in Łódź, Poland in 2009.
 Ordre des Arts et des Lettres
 Knight (2013)
 Raindance Film Festival announced on 13 August 2018, that he would be the next recipient of its Auteur Award for his contribution to UK film.
 Inkpot Award (2009)

References

Further reading

External links 

 
 
 Dreams: The Terry Gilliam Fanzine
 
 

 
1940 births
Living people
20th-century American comedians
20th-century British comedians
21st-century American comedians
21st-century British comedians
Animators from Minnesota
British animators
British film directors
American animated film directors
British male actors
American male comedians
British male comedians
American comics artists
British comics artists
British male comedy actors
American male comedy actors
American comedy writers
British comedy writers
American emigrants to England
American expatriates in England
BAFTA fellows
British opera directors
Chevaliers of the Ordre des Arts et des Lettres
British copywriters
British people of American descent
English male film actors
Inkpot Award winners
Album-cover and concert-poster artists
Comedy film directors
Fantasy film directors
Science fiction film directors
Film directors from Minnesota
Male actors from Minneapolis
Monty Python members
Naturalised citizens of the United Kingdom
Occidental College alumni
People from Hennepin County, Minnesota
People from Panorama City, Los Angeles
Former United States citizens
People who renounced United States citizenship
Stop motion animators
Film directors from Los Angeles
American surrealist artists
British surrealist artists
Surrealist filmmakers
Birmingham High School alumni
Postmodernist filmmakers